Charnley River–Artesian Range Wildlife Sanctuary is a protected area covering about  in the Kimberley region of Western Australia. It is named after the Charnley River that flows through the property.

It is operated as a sanctuary by the Australian Wildlife Conservancy (AWC), a public charity. The sanctuary occupies the former Charnley River Station, a pastoral lease that operated as a cattle station and was formerly known as the Beverley Springs Station, along with land owned by the Department of Biodiversity, Conservation and Attractions and managed jointly with the AWC. The AWC leases part of the land to Australian Capital Equity (ACE) after selling the cattle to them, and ACE now operates a cattle station on part of the land, excluding key areas such as rivers.

The AWC operates a wilderness camp and interpretation centre in the sanctuary, and visitors can hike and swim in the sanctuary's gorges.

History of the station 
It was the first property along the Gibb River road to offer accommodation to tourists. Marion Nixon wrote Children in the Sun, a book about raising her five children on the station, and later wrote Stop whispering Annie.

The Barrett family acquired the property in 1981. The two sons, Matt and Russell, discovered an unknown species of pitcher plant on the property, going on to be botanists specialising in the Kimberley region. They rediscovered a species of Auranticarpa collected during the expedition of Philip Parker King in 1821 and later thought to be extinct.

In 2010 the property was bought by Peter and Cheryl Camp, who renamed it the Charnley River Station, ran a herd of approximately 3,000 cattle, and built up its tourism potential. The property was sold again in February 2011, to Australian Wildlife Conservancy.

Description
The cattle are not allowed to roam freely over important ecological areas such as the river systems, and the AWC works on controlling feral animals and weeds throughout the sanctuary. The WA Department of Biodiversity, Conservation and Attractions owns the other , managed by the Parks and Wildlife Service in partnership with AWC.

The AWC undertakes research on methods of fire control, control of feral animals (which include pigs, donkeys, cattle and brumbies), especially in the lower-lying savannah areas in the southern and eastern parts of the sanctuary, and on the effect of the various threats on specific wildlife species.

Access to the Charnley River Station, which caters for campers, although no longer provides accommodation or meals, is via the Gibb River Road. There are three gorges with freshwater pools (Paradise Pool, Dillie Gorge and Donkey Hole) within the old cattle station property, two of which are fed by springs. The property has its own airstrip.

Species

The sanctuary is home to 11 threatened species of animals, and a further 29 that include species either endemic or with only isolated populations in the Kimberley. Mammals include the Wyulda (scaly-tailed possum), the tiny rock-wallaby known as monjon, and the Kimberley rock rat. Endemic birds on the property include the black grasswren and Kimberley honeyeater, and there are a number of endemic reptile species, such as the rough-scaled python, Kimberley crevice skink, and a number of gecko species. There are species which are now extinct in large areas where they were previously present, including the golden-backed tree-rat and the golden bandicoot.

Adjoining properties
On the south-west the Sanctuary shares a boundary with Wunaamin Miliwundi Ranges Conservation Park, which was formerly Mount Hart Station. Mount House Station is to the south-east.

Wilinggin and Munja
Charnley River is bounded on the north and east by Wilinggin Indigenous Protected Area. The (historic) Munja Aboriginal Cattle Station, also known as the Munja Aboriginal reserve, lay or lies just to the east of the Walcott Inlet, within the Artesian Range, either within the Wilinggin IPA or within the Charnley River sanctuary. Around 700 Aboriginal people were based around this location in 1927, which was initially government-run before being transferred to the Presbyterian Church in 1940, although negotiations were not completed until 1949 owing to World War II. It was also known as Avon Valley Cattle Station.

See also
List of ranches and stations

References

External links

Kimberley (Western Australia)
Stations (Australian agriculture)
Pastoral leases in Western Australia
Protected areas of Western Australia
Kimberley tropical savanna